Events from the year 1593 in the Kingdom of Scotland.

Incumbents
Monarch – James VI

Events
 24 July - Raid of Holyrood, the rebel Francis Stewart, 5th Earl of Bothwell infiltrates Holyrood Palace.
 12 November – decree orders Catholics to give up their faith or leave the country.
 7 December – Battle of Dryfe Sands: the Clan Johnstone defeat the Clan Maxwell at Skipmyre, just west of Lockerbie, and Lord Maxwell is killed.
Marischal College is founded in Aberdeen by George Keith, 5th Earl Marischal.
Emergence of the Presbytery of Glasgow within the developing Presbyterian polity.
The Banffshire constituency is first represented in the Parliament of Scotland (by Sir Walter Ogilvie).

Births
 13 April – Thomas Wentworth, 1st Earl of Strafford, English politician (executed 1641)
 2 May – John Forbes of Corse, theologian (died 1648)
Robert Blair, moderator (died 1666)

Deaths
 16 January – Laurence Oliphant, 4th Lord Oliphant (born 1529)
 4 February – Robert Stewart, 1st Earl of Orkney (born 1533/4)
 26 May – William Baillie, Lord Provand, judge
 23 August – Adam Bothwell, bishop, judge and politician (born c.1527)
 26 September – William Chisholm, bishop of Dunblane (born 1525/6)
 7 December – John Maxwell, 8th Lord Maxwell (born 1553)
 date unknown –
William Ashby, English politician
William Forbes of Corsindae

See also
 Timeline of Scottish history

References